Magnus Olsson may refer to:
 Magnus Olsson (bandy) (born 1972), Swedish bandy player
 Magnus Olsson (sailor)

See also
Magnus Olsen (1878–1963), Norwegian linguist